Holcostethus is a genus of shield bugs belonging to the family Pentatomidae, subfamily Pentatominae.

Species
These 18 species belong to the genus Holcostethus.
 Holcostethus abbreviatus Uhler, 1872
 Holcostethus albipes (Fabricius, 1781)
 Holcostethus breviceps Horváth, 1897
 Holcostethus evae Ribes, 1988
 Holcostethus fissiceps Horváth, 1906
 Holcostethus fulvipes (Ruckes, 1957)
 Holcostethus hirtus (Van Duzee, 1937)
 Holcostethus limbolarius (Stål, 1872)
 Holcostethus macdonaldi Rider & Rolston, 1995
 Holcostethus piceus (Dallas, 1851)
 Holcostethus ovatus (Jakovlev, 1889)
 Holcostethus piceus (Dallas, 1851)
 Holcostethus punctatus (Lindberg, 1935)
 Holcostethus ruckesi McDonald, 1975
 Holcostethus sphacelatus (Fabricius, 1794)
 Holcostethus strictus (Fabricius, 1803)
 Holcostethus tristis (Van Duzee, 1904)
 Holcostethus vernalis (Wolff, 1804)

References

 Rider D.A., 2004 - Family Pentatomidae - Catalogue of the Heteroptera of the Palaearctic Region

External links
 Fauna Europaea
 BioLib

Pentatomidae genera
Pentatomini